Tseilhoutuo Rhütso, popularly known as Dr. Ato, is an Indian politician from Nagaland. He was elected to the Nagaland Legislative Assembly in 2023 from Kohima Town Assembly constituency as a candidate of the National People's Party.

References

External links 

 Tseilhoutuo Rhütso on Instagram

Nagaland politicians
Year of birth missing (living people)
Living people
People from Viswema
People from Kohima
National People's Party (India) politicians
Nagaland MLAs 2023–2028